The Associated Chambers of Commerce and Industry of India is a non-governmental trade association and advocacy group based in New Delhi, India. The organisation represents the interests of trade and commerce in India, and acts as an interface between issues and initiatives. The goal of this organisation is to promote both domestic and international trade, and reduce trade barriers while fostering conducive environment for the growth of trade and industry of India.

Background
ASSOCHAM was established in 1920 by a group of chambers of commerce led by the Calcutta Traders Association. The Association's head office is located in New Delhi and regional offices are located in the cities of Ahmedabad, Bengaluru, Ranchi, Jammu, Chandigarh and Kolkata. , ASSOCHAM covers a membership of over 4.5 lakh companies and professionals across the country.

ASSOCHAM members represent the following sectors: 
 Trade (national and international)
 Industry (domestic and international)
 Professionals (e.g., CAs, CSs, CMAs, lawyers, consultants)

The association has appointed Vineet Agar, the managing director of Transport Corporation of India, as its new president to replace Niranjan Hiranandani in 2021.

In 2021 the association held a virtual summit by the name of Xelerate North, where the Himachal Pradesh Industries Minister Bikram Singh and others were invited to discuss industry issues.

Committees
ASSOCHAM operates 59 Expert Committees, 10 state councils and 11 International Councils that provide an interactive platform to members for interaction and aid formulating policy recommendations to facilitate economic, industrial and social growth. The association has a special role in promoting international trade, and often hosts international trade delegates to India, along with sending delegations of Indian business groups to foreign locations. It also interacts with international counterpart organisations to promote bilateral economic issues. ASSOCHAM is a member of the International Chamber of Commerce, the World Business Organisation, through ICC, India.

ASSOCHAM is authorised by the Government of India to issue Certificates of Origin, certify commercial invoices, and recommend business visa.

References

External links 

 Official website

 
1920 establishments in India
Trade associations based in India
Chambers of commerce in India
Ministry of Micro, Small and Medium Enterprises
Non-profit organisations based in India
Organisations based in Delhi
Organizations established in 1920